Kieran Gallagher (born 10 March 1990) is a British racing driver who last competed in the British Touring Car Championship with Team HARD. In 2013 Gallagher competed in the British Touring Car Championship for the first time at Knockhill, driving for Team HARD in a Vauxhall Insignia NGTC. After a season back in the wagen Racing Cup with Team HARD he remained with the team for their return to the BTCC in 2015

Career
Gallagher gained his racing license in 2012 and entered the Scottish Legends Cars Championship in June that year. In 2013 he remained in the series but joined Burnett Motorsport. In August that year Team HARD entered Gallagher in the Knockhill round of the British Touring Car Championship, driving one of the team's Vauxhall Insignia NGTC cars. He stated that his aim was to achieve a top-18 finish. He finished 22nd in race one, 20th in race two, and took 13th in the final race of the weekend. He remained with Team HARD for their 2014 Volkswagen Racing Cup campaign. He also drove for Parr Motorsport in the Porsche Carrera Cup Great Britain that year.

In 2015, when Team HARD returned to the BTCC with a Toyota Avensis, they selected Gallagher as their driver.

Personal life
Gallagher has two older brothers, and works as a Hydrographic Surveyor.

Racing record

Complete British Touring Car Championship results
(key) (Races in bold indicate pole position – 1 point awarded in first race) (Races in italics indicate fastest lap – 1 point awarded all races) (* signifies that driver lead race for at least one lap – 1 point awarded all races)

References

Living people
Sportspeople from Edinburgh
British Touring Car Championship drivers
Scottish racing drivers
1990 births
Porsche Carrera Cup GB drivers